"Honey" is a song by American singer R. Kelly and American rapper Jay-Z. It samples "Love You Inside Out" by the Bee Gees and is also co-written by the song producers, Poke and Tone. It was released in late 2002 as the first single from The Best of Both Worlds. It peaked at number 109 on the Billboard Hot R&B/Hip-Hop Songs. The song charted at number 35 on the UK Singles Chart and 84 on the Australian singles chart. No music video was filmed for the song.

Charts

References

2002 singles
Jay-Z songs
R. Kelly songs
Songs written by R. Kelly
Songs written by Jay-Z
Songs written by Maurice Gibb
Songs written by Barry Gibb
Songs written by Robin Gibb
Songs written by Samuel Barnes (songwriter)
Songs written by Jean-Claude Olivier
Song recordings produced by Trackmasters